Cathcart Hospital is a Provincial government funded hospital in Cathcart, Eastern Cape in South Africa.

The hospital departments include Emergency department, Paediatric ward, Maternity ward, Surgical Services, Medical Services, Operating Theatre & CSSD Services, Pharmacy, Anti-Retroviral (ARV) treatment for HIV/AIDS, Laundry Services, Kitchen Services and Mortuary.

References
 Eastern Cape Department of Health website - Amathole District Hospitals

Hospitals in the Eastern Cape
Amathole District Municipality